Stratos is a settlement in central Aetolia-Acarnania, Western Greece. It is best known for its impressive remains of the namesake ancient Greek city and capital of Acarnania, which lie on a hillside about 500m north of the modern village.

Stratos is situated on the right bank of the river Acheloos, 9 km northwest of the town of Agrinio. The area north of Stratos is mountainous, whereas the south is flat. It is now an Aromanian (Vlach) village and a municipal unit of the  Agrinio municipality.

History

Its situation at the northern edge of the fertile Achelous River plain and on the strategic maritime route to Italy as well as the navigability of the river up to city made it a place of great military importance  and Stratos emerged as the largest and best fortified city of Acarnania. It was where judicial proceedings common to all the Arcananians took place, and by Thucydides' time Stratos was the capital of Acarnania and the federal assemblies were held there. As a result, it prospered greatly in the 5th century BC.

As capital of Acarnania, Stratos was involved in many wars. In the 5th century BC, the Corinthians were forced out of their Acarnanian settlements by Athens. In 429 BC in the Pelopponesian War, the Pelopponesians under the Spartan Knemos attacked Stratos and were defeated "with great slaughter". In about 390 BC the cities of Acarnania surrendered to the Spartans under King Agesilaus, and continued to be Spartan allies until joining the Second Athenian Empire in 375 BC. The Acarnanians later sided with the Boeotians in their fight against Sparta, and with Athens against Philip II of Macedon at Chaeronea.

In 314 BC,  King Cassander of Macedon took the city to use as a military base against the Aetolians. After 252 BC however, Stratos fell to the Aetolians. During the march of Philip V on Thermos in the Social War in 218 BC, he marched along the Achelous and on to Stratos where he unsuccessfully challenged the citizens to fight.

In 169 BC, Stratos invited the Romans into Greece as allies against Perseus of Macedon. With the founding of Nicopolis in 28BC, much of the population was obliged to move to the new city and Stratos fell into decline.

Monuments

 	
The main excavations are of the Agora and Stoa, the Temple of Zeus, the theatre, and the city walls.

Temple of Zeus

The temple stands on the top of a fortified hill at the remote northwest end of the city. It is one of the most important Early Hellenistic buildings in mainland Greece. It was of the Doric order, with Corinthian columns in the cella. In addition to this combination of architectural orders, the monument shows several more structural and planning innovations. Construction of the temple began in 321 BC but was never finished, probably due to fights against the Aetolians. For example, the fluting of the columns was never completed and the column drums retain their bosses (used for maneuvering the heavy blocks during the critical lifting phase). The remains of the temple show the exquisite detail of sculpture in its construction, and also the excellent state of preservation of the base and many constituent blocks despite almost 2500 years of weathering.

Walls

The area enclosed by the city walls of 7.5 km length including four long hills and three valleys is alone impressive, their height and strength also. They are constructed of massive blocks and include towers at intervals.

Modern village
Before 1928 the village was named Sorovigli.
Before the 2011 local government reform Stratos was an independent municipality. The municipal unit has an area of 153.307 km2, the community 30.313 km2. The municipal unit had a population of 5,429 in 2011, the community 979.

See also
List of ancient Greek cities

References

External links
 The Temple of Zeus at Stratos: New Observations on the Building Design: Jari Pakkanen, ARCTOS ACTA PHILOLOGICA FENNICA VOL. XXXVIII (https://www.researchgate.net/publication/275730226_The_Temple_of_Zeus_at_Stratos_New_Observations_on_the_Building_Design)
http://www.finninstitute.gr/en/stratos
Municipality of Stratos 

Populated places in Aetolia-Acarnania
Aromanian settlements in Greece
Ancient Greek archaeological sites in Greece